The second season of Full Metal Panic, titled Full Metal Panic! The Second Raid, is a Japanese anime television series directed by Yasuhiro Takemoto and animated by Kyoto Animation. It is the third television series based on the Full Metal Panic! light novel series and is adapted from the two Ending Day by Day novels (volumes four and five). It continues the story from the first anime series, with Sousuke Sagara and his allies from Mithril facing a new organization opposing them called "Amalgam".

The series aired from July 13, 2005 to October 19, 2005. An additional OVA episode was released on DVD. The series was licensed for the North American market by Funimation but the production work and English dubbing was done by A.D. Vision.


Episode list

References

2005 Japanese television seasons
Full Metal Panic!